Dristner is a mountain in the Zillertal valley of Austria. The summit can be reached by starting in the village of Ginzling.

Mountains of Tyrol (state)
Mountains of the Alps